Buxus nyasica is a species of plant in the family Buxaceae. It is endemic to Malawi.  It is threatened by habitat loss.

References

nyasica
Endangered plants
Endemic flora of Malawi
Taxonomy articles created by Polbot